Rasmus Nyerup (12 March 1759–28 June 1829) was a Danish literary historian, philologist, folklorist and librarian.

Biography
He was born at  the village of Nyrup near Glamsbjerg on Funen, Denmark.  
After graduating from Odense Lærde Skole, Nyerup studied philology and theology and took exams in resp. 1779 and 1780. 
He was assistant at the Royal Library from 1778, and its secretary during 1709–1803.
In the period 1790–1797, he was editor of the literary-critical journal Kiøbenhavnske lærde Efterretninger. He became a professor of literary history at the University of Copenhagen in 1796.
From 1803, he was head librarian of Copenhagen University Library.

Nyerup wrote and published a number of historical, literary-historical and cultural-historical works. Together With Rasmus Rask (1787–1832), he published a Danish translation of the Prose Edda in 1808,  and with 
Jens Edvard Kraft (1784–1853) a general literary history of Denmark, Norway and Iceland (1818/9). Together with Knud Lyne Rahbek (1760–1830) and Werner Abrahamson (1744-1812),  Nyerup was also responsible for the publication of folk songs from the Middle Ages in Udvalgte Danske Viser fra Middelalderen  (Copenhagen: J. F. Schulz, 1812–14).

Nyerup was co-founder of the society Selskabet for Efterslægten (1786) and the Scandinavian Literary Society (1796). As secretary of the  Royal Commission on the Preservation of Antiquities (Den kongelige Commission til Oldsagers Opbevaring),  Nyerup  also helped Christian Jürgensen Thomsen (1788–1865)  initiate the foundation of the National Museum of Denmark.

References

Other sources
C.L.Ström, Professor og Ridder Rasmus Nyerups Levnetslöb, beskrevet af ham selv (1829).

Danish librarians
18th-century Danish historians
19th-century Danish historians
Academic staff of the University of Copenhagen
Royal Library, Denmark
1759 births
1829 deaths